Ryan Taylor is an Irish hurler who plays as a forward for the Clare senior team. At club level Taylor plays with Clooney-Quin.

References

Clare inter-county hurlers
Year of birth missing (living people)
Place of birth missing (living people)
Living people
21st-century Irish people